Hacı Sabancı (25 June 1935 – 26 June 1998) was a Turkish businessman and philanthropist, and a member of the second generation of the renowned Sabancı family.

He was born in the Akçakaya village of Kayseri Province as the third son of Hacı Ömer Sabancı, who founded Turkey's second largest industrial and financial conglomerate, Sabancı Holding.

Hacı went to school and spent most of his life in Adana. After dropping out of the secondary school, he started his career in the family-owned automobile dealing and cotton exporting companies. He later served at several top management posts in different companies of Sabancı Holding. He was also president of the board of trustees of Sabancı Foundation VakSA.

Family
He married Özcan in 1959. They had two sons, Ömer in 1959 and Mehmet in 1963, and a daughter, Demet. Mehmet died of a heart attack in 2005.

Death
Hacı Sabancı died on 26 June 1998, the day after his 63rd birthday, in İstanbul after a two-year struggle against lung cancer. He was laid to rest in Adana next to his murdered brother Özdemir.

Honorary doctorates
 Çukurova University, Adana
 East Mediterranean University, Northern Cyprus

Awards
 Order of Supreme Merit of Turkey presented by President Süleyman Demirel
 "Best Trading Executive of the Balkans" by the International Association of Business Administration

References

Links
 Our unforgettables at Sabancı Holding website

1935 births
1998 deaths
People from Talas, Turkey
Haci Sabanci
20th-century Turkish businesspeople
Deaths from lung cancer in Turkey
Burials at Adana Asri Cemetery